Kamil Rado (born 20 September 1990 in Mielec) is a Polish footballer who plays for Garbarnia Kraków.

Career

Club
He made his debut for Wisła Kraków in Ekstraklasa on 8 August 2010 in a match against Arka Gdynia.

In February 2011, he was loaned to Kolejarz Stróże on a half year deal.

Honours

Wisła Kraków 
Ekstraklasa: 2010–11

References

External links
 

Polish footballers
Wisła Kraków players
Kolejarz Stróże players
1990 births
Living people
People from Mielec
Sportspeople from Podkarpackie Voivodeship
Association football midfielders